Edward Michael Melvin (born Ed Milkovich; February 13, 1916 – July 30, 2004) was an American professional basketball player. He played in the Basketball Association of America for the Pittsburgh Ironmen during the 1946–47 season.

After his playing career, Melvin coached the St. Bonavanture Bonnies and Toledo Rockets men's basketball teams between 1947 and 1965. In his 17 years as an NCAA Division I head coach, Melvin compiled an overall record of 222–179, including three consecutive conference regular season championships from 1950 to 1952.

He was a southpaw; Eddie Beachler of The Pittsburgh Press described his left-handed dribble and push-shot as "deceptive", while Dan McGibbeny of Pittsburgh Post-Gazette several years after Melvin's retirement from playing recounted how he was "a sprightly lad with a rare ability to dribble left-handed for a full game."

Melvin was of Serbian origin. He legally changed his last name from Milkovich to Melvin in late 1951.

BAA career statistics

Regular season

References

1916 births
2004 deaths
All-American college men's basketball players
American basketball scouts
American men's basketball players
American people of Serbian descent
Basketball coaches from Pennsylvania
Basketball players from Pittsburgh
Duquesne Dukes men's basketball players
Guards (basketball)
Original Celtics players
Philadelphia 76ers scouts
Pittsburgh Ironmen players
Sportspeople from Pittsburgh
St. Bonaventure Bonnies men's basketball coaches
Toledo Rockets men's basketball coaches
Undrafted National Basketball Association players